Kazimierz Zdziechowski, also known under pseudonyms Władysław Zdora, Władysław Mouner, (1878–1942) was a Polish landowner, prose writer, publicist, literary critic and novelist. Brother of Marian Zdziechowski, Polish philologist and philosopher.

Biography
Zdziechowski was born on 14 March 1878 in Raków, Belarus. He graduated law in university of Moscow. Then, he managed family estate in Raków. Since 1896 he collaborated with press as a prose writer, publicist and literary critic. Zdziechowski was murdered on 4 August 1942 during the Second World War in the German concentration camp Auschwitz.

Works
 Fuimus (1900) – socio-psychological novel
 Przemiany, vol. 1–2 (1906)
 Łuna, vol. 1–2 (1910) 
 Opoka (1912)
 Kresy (1920)

References
 
 

1878 births
1942 deaths
People from Valozhyn District
People from Minsky Uyezd
20th-century Polish novelists
Polish male novelists
Polish literary critics
Polish publicists
20th-century Polish male writers
Polish civilians killed in World War II
Polish people who died in Auschwitz concentration camp